Aubertin is a commune in the Pyrénées-Atlantiques department in the Nouvelle-Aquitaine region of south-western France.

The inhabitants of the commune are known as Aubertinois or Aubertinoises.

Geography
Aubertin is located in Béarn some 10 km west of Pau and 8 km north-west of Gan. Access to the commune is by the D146 from Artiguelouve in the north-east which passes through the north of the commune and goes west to Lacommande. Access to the village is by the D346 which branches south from the D146 in the commune and continues through the village to join the D24 some 6 km west of Gan. The commune has a mix of forest and farmland throughout its territory.

The Baïse forms the western border of the commune as it flows north to join the Gave de Pau at Abidos. The Juscle rises in the south-east of the commune and flows north to join the Gave de Pau at Bésingrand. Each river gathers many small tributaries that rise in the commune.

Places and hamlets

Arizet
Arrouset
Arrouzes
Baherle
Bahette
Barbe
Barrere
Barrot
Baudorre
Bayle
Bengueres
Benoit
Benterou
Bernat
Bertrand
Beteille
Blazy
Bonneton
Bordechy
Bory
Bouchet
Burret
Cabarrecq
Calotte
Camy
Casedeyan
Cassou
Catihaut
Caussit
Caussitou
Cazenave
Chicot
Chounet
Clamens
Claverie
Constantine
Couy
Crasman
Cuyala
David
Espa
Haget
Heroulet
Heugas
Hourat
Hourcade
Istehnou
Jagou
Joliment
Labarthe
Labasse
Labat
Labegorre
Labesque
Labory
Lacarrieu
Lacoste
Lacrouts
Lagrave
Lahitole
Lamasouere
Lanardonne
Lapet
Laplume
Lardit
Larriscat
Larriu
Laymar
Lebe
Lembeye
Lespees
Lestanguet
Lous
Loustau
Mazou
Mene
Mesple
Mialou
Miramont
Mirassou
Modet
Montagnette
Montis
Mourterat
Mourthe
Navailles
Palassou
Palou
Pargade
Pedane
Penen
Pepicq
Perry
Peyrenere
Poeydevant
Porte
Poumade
Puyade
Reyau
Rontignon
Saliou
Sarthou
Serrot
Setze
Soldat
Talabot
Talet
Tiret
Toulas
Tucou
Turoun
Vignau

Neighbouring communes and villages

Toponymy
Among the hypotheses on the origin of the name Aubertin, Michel Grosclaude favours that of a Gascon man's name (diminutive of Aubert) or the Latin Albertinus rather than the German Adalbehrt.

The following table details the origins of the commune name and other names in the commune.

Sources:

Raymond: Topographic Dictionary of the Department of Basses-Pyrenees, 1863, on the page numbers indicated in the table. 

Origins:
Marca: Pierre de Marca, History of Béarn.
Fors de Béarn
Census: Census of Béarn
Reformation: Reformation of Béarn
Insinuations: Insinuations of the Diocese of Oloron

History
When the name Aubertin appears in texts from the beginning of the 12th century, it is difficult to associate it with a specific territory. It is known that there was a beech grove at Aubertin (Faget d'Aubertii), in the middle of which Gaston IV of Béarn, called le Croisé (The Crusader), began building a hospital in the years 1115-1118. This foundation was challenged by the Lord of Bedosse and his descendants who claimed ownership of the soil. The Albertine charter signed in 1128 resolved the dispute and allowed the development of the hospital which was opened shortly after a church, a cloister and a cemetery. Farmland extended from the left bank of the Baïse to the top of the hill to the west on the territory of the present village of Lacommande.

At the beginning of the 13th century, this place became the Commandery of Aubertin - the main establishment of the Priory of Sainte-Christine-du-Somport on the northern slopes of the Pyrenees. By contrast, the origin of the Bedosse family and the extension of their domains remains unknown. For centuries Monein continued to claim ownership of this enclave of the Commandery of Aubertin.

Texts from the middle of the 12th century also report a lordship at Artiguelouve which extended from the Gave de Pau to the Baïse on the current communes of Artiguelouve and Aubertin. So, in 1160 Guillaume of Artiguelouve and one called Loup Bergunh sold  the land and woods located on the right bank of the Bayse for grazing their herds to the priory of Sainte-Christine-du-Somport and the Aubertin hospital.

Although the territory of the present village of Aubertin has long remained in the orbit of the lordship of Artiguelouve, from the beginning most people seem to have attended the church of the Commandery. The count by Gaston Febus in 1385 reported a parish of Aubertii distinct from that of Artiguelobe. It comprised a total of 46 fires including 3 which were explicitly at Aubertin the hospital.

In 1402, the lord of Artiguelouve made common cause with the commandery of Aubertin in a lawsuit between them and the community of Monein but in 1538 the commander of Aubertin, Jean de Borau, reported that Arnaud Guilhem d'Artiguelouve had usurped the rights of the Commandery. Relations between the two communities were close but fluctuated.

When Arnaud Guilhem d'Artiguelouve married Anne d'Albret on 9 February 1534 he was called Lord of Artiguelouve, Aubertin, and Montardon and appeared to be at the height of his glory. The situation gradually deteriorated over the generations. In 1555 his son, Arnaud, sold half the tithes from Artiguelouve and Aubertin to Peyrot de Pedelaborde of Lagor. He was soon no longer designated as Lord of Artiguelouve and Aubertin which suggested the final sale of the lordship of Montardon. On the other hand, the inhabitants of Aubertin had some autonomy in the management of their affairs as they were represented by a trustee and 5 aldermen from 1570 during some events of the Protestant Reformation. Around 1583 Arnaud d'Artiguelouve afiefed the woods of Aubertin as surety for a loan. Bernard, who succeeded Arnaud, remained lord of Artiguelouve and Aubertin but debts accumulated. His son John was forced to sell the chateau and lands of Aubertin to François de Navailles on 30 June 1640. Finally, Jean sold the lordship of Artiguelouve itself to Pierre de Fouron on 11 April 1642.

30 June 1640 was a crucial date in the history of Aubertin. It affirmed the identity of the village and marked the emergence of a new centre of power from an Artiguelouve lordship which disintegrated to a commandery which, after the Reformation, passed to the control of the Barnabites of Lescar. Five generations of Navailles-Mirepeix would follow in Aubertin. The last, Louis-François, gave a reckoning of his domain of Aubertin for the Parliament of Navarre on 8 July 1776. This document gives a fairly accurate picture of the lordship of Aubertin before the French Revolution.

Some years before, in 1773, he initiated a project to build a church near the chateau with the support of the Bishop of Oloron. This project was not successful because Louis-François de Navailles emigrated to Spain during the Revolution. The Aubertin people felt duty-bound to continue and financed most of the Church of Saint-Blaise in Lacommande, the adjacent cemetery, and the church rectory, although two separate communes were created in 1790. They continued, however, to be only one parish until 1867 when the opening of a church in Aubertin and a new historical turning point: a village centre could finally develop around its bell tower, to which was added a cemetery, manse, town hall, and a school.

Administration

List of Successive Mayors

Inter-communality
The commune is part of five inter-communal structures:
 the Communauté d'agglomération Pau Béarn Pyrénées;
 the SIVOM of the Canton of Lasseube;
 the joint association for the Gave de Pau;
 the SIVU for the development and management of the rivers in the Baises basin;
 the association for the development of the Drainage basin of the Juscle and its tributaries;

Demography
In 2017 the commune had 656 inhabitants.

Economy
The commune is part of the Appellation d'origine contrôlée zone of Jurançon AOC and Béarn AOC. Economic activity is mainly agricultural. Aubertin is also part of the AOC zone of Ossau-iraty.
In 1966, the Société Nationale des Pétroles d’Aquitaine (SNPA - now part of Elf Aquitaine) discovered gas in Aubertin. Two gas wells are still active.

Culture and heritage

Civil heritage
A very old Bridge over the Bayse at Goua-de-Labat
The Château de Navailles

Religious heritage
The Church of Saint-Augustin'' (1859) is registered as a historical monument. A porch was added to the tower in the 20th century.
A Chapel was built just before the French Revolution in another place near the Château de Navailles, but it was destroyed before it was used.

Facilities
There is a primary school built in 1880 with a canteen and a fronton in the courtyard.
There is a public sports facility with a bowling pitch, tennis courts, and a handball court.

Notable people linked to the communeJean Reyau, Mayor of Aubertin from 1831 to 1842, was a bodyguard for Louis XVIII.Albert Peyroutet, born in Aubertin in 1931 and died in 2009, was an Occitan writer and an associate professor of English and Occitan.René Camy''', teacher, mayor, and General Councillor of the Canton of Lasseube (1965-1976), Chevalier of the Legion of Honour with academic palms.

See also
Communes of the Pyrénées-Atlantiques department

External links
Aubertin on Géoportail, National Geographic Institute (IGN) website 
Aubertin on the 1750 Cassini Map

References

Communes of Pyrénées-Atlantiques